Khowa may refer to:
 Khowa people, or Bugun, an ethnic group of north-eastern India
 Khowa language, the Sino-Tibetan language spoken by them
 Elliot, South Africa, a town which was renamed Khowa

See also 
 Khowar language, an Indo-Aryan language of northern Pakistan
 Khoa
 Khoua District, in Laos